Lysipatha diaxantha is a moth in the family Gelechiidae. It was described by Edward Meyrick in 1932. It is found in Taiwan.

References

Gnorimoschemini
Moths described in 1932